Steeven Joël Langil (born 4 March 1988) is a Martiniquais footballer who plays as a winger.

Career
Langil was born in Fort-de-France in Martinique, but grew up in Morne Rouge. He and his family later moved to the city of Montpellier. He began his career playing for third division club Nîmes. He was promoted to the first team in 2006 and appeared in 11 games, scoring two goals. Following the season, he moved to Ligue 1 club AJ Auxerre.

Auxerre
In Auxerre, he did not feature often. However, he scored an important goal against Ajax Amsterdam during the 2010–11 UEFA Champions League group stage, in which Auxerre came out on top 2-1. After a two-year stint with Auxerre, he joined on loan successively Caen, Valenciennes and Sedan.

Guingamp
In June 2013, he signed a contract with the Breton club EA Guingamp, which just got promoted into Ligue 1.

Royal Mouscron-Péruwelz
On 16 July 2014, Langil joined the newly promoted Belgian Pro League side Royal Mouscron-Péruwelz prior to the 2014–15 season.

International goals
As of match played 8 July 2017. Martinique score listed first, score column indicates score after each Langil goal.

References

External links

 Steeven Langil de Nîmes à l'AJA Dailymotion Video
 Steeven Langil Skynetblogs.be
 
 Footmercato Profile
 foot-national.com Profile
 
 
 

1988 births
Living people
French people of Martiniquais descent
Association football wingers
French footballers
Martiniquais footballers
Nîmes Olympique players
AJ Auxerre players
Stade Malherbe Caen players
Valenciennes FC players
CS Sedan Ardennes players
En Avant Guingamp players
Royal Excel Mouscron players
Legia Warsaw players
S.K. Beveren players
NEC Nijmegen players
Steeven Langil
Ligue 1 players
Ligue 2 players
Ekstraklasa players
Belgian Pro League players
Eredivisie players
Steeven Langil
France under-21 international footballers
Martinique international footballers
French expatriate footballers
Martiniquais expatriate footballers
2017 CONCACAF Gold Cup players
Expatriate footballers in Belgium
Expatriate footballers in Poland
Expatriate footballers in the Netherlands
Expatriate footballers in Thailand
French expatriate sportspeople in Belgium
French expatriate sportspeople in Poland
French expatriate sportspeople in the Netherlands
French expatriate sportspeople in Thailand
Martiniquais expatriate sportspeople in Belgium
Martiniquais expatriate sportspeople in Poland
Martiniquais expatriate sportspeople in the Netherlands
Martiniquais expatriate sportspeople in Thailand